The DVV-Pokal für Frauen is the national cup competition of German women's volleyball . The organizer is the German Volleyball Association (DVV). The finals have been held in the SAP Arena in Mannheim since 2016. The current title holders in 2021 are the Schweriner SC.

Competition history 

The DVV Cup has been held since 1973. Its East German counterpart was the FDGB Cup under the direction of the German Sports Association Volleyball of the GDR (DSVB), which was held between 1953 and 1991.

From 2006 to 2015 the finals took place in the Gerry Weber Stadium in Halle. In April 2015, the DVV announced that there was a new venue.  Since February 28, 2016, the finals have been held in the SAP Arena in Mannheim. In March 2018, the German Volleyball Association, the Volleyball Bundesliga and the operators of the SAP Arena agreed to extend the two-year contract by two more years until 2020. The contract, which expires in 2020, was again extended to at least 2025.

List of Champions

Honours by club

References

External links
www.volleyball-verband.de 

Volleyball in Germany